The Dutch Ambonese Malay (or by the speakers called Melayu Sini or Malaju Sini) is a dialect of Ambonese Malay spoken by Ambonese or Moluccans who migrated to the Netherlands since the 1950s and related to the South Maluku Republic and loyalty to the Kingdom of the Netherlands.

Malaju Sini is used by the second and third generations Moluccans in the Netherlands. She shows influences from Barracks Malay (Tangsi Malay), a simplified form of Standard Malay which was used in the KNIL about which not much is known, and especially of the Dutch.

Usages
Malaju Sini is not spoken by all Moluccans living in the Netherlands. There are many monolingual Dutch-speaking Moluccans, especially outside the traditional Moluccan neighbourhoods. Nevertheless, Malaju Sini remains an important element of the sense of community for those who do speak it.

References

Further reading

External links
Divergence in heritage Ambon Malay in the Netherlands: The role of social-psychological factors
Give-Constructions in Heritage Ambon Malay in the Netherlands
The waxing and waning of a diaspora: Moluccans in the Netherlands, 1950–2002

Agglutinative languages
Languages of the Netherlands
Malay-based pidgins and creoles